is a Japanese manga artist, known for his seinen works. He won the Topic Award of the 2005 Sense of Gender Awards for Ressentiment and was nominated for the 3rd, 4th and 5th Manga Taisho for I Am a Hero. His series Boys on the Run was adapted into a live action film in 2010. He formerly worked as Osamu Uoto's assistant.

Works
 Ressentiment (2004–2005, Big Comic Spirits, Shogakukan)
 Boys on the Run (2005–2008, Big Comic Spirits, Shogakukan)
 I Am a Hero (2009–2017, Big Comic Spirits, Shogakukan)
 Under Ninja (2018–present, Weekly Young Magazine, Kodansha)

References

External links 

Living people
1974 births
Manga artists from Aomori Prefecture
People from Hachinohe